Stephen Moses (born November 29, 1954) is a rock drummer and a trombonist. He is a founding member of Alice Donut, and also currently plays with MJ12 with Percy Jones and Rosenbloom. He has recorded with a number of artists over the years, and has played trombone on five albums by Sour Jazz.

Partial discography
 see Alice Donut
 Love God soundtrack
 Scratch
 Blind Melon - Soup (song: St Andrew's Fall)
 Voltaire (musician) - Almost Human
 Voltaire - BooHoo (projekt 129, 2002)
 Voltaire - Then and Again (projekt 162, 2004)
 Deep Water (Antilles, 1988)
 Sour Jazz - No Values (1999)
 Sour Jazz - Lost For Life (2001)
 Sour Jazz - Dressed To the Left (2001)
 Sour Jazz - Rock & Roll Ligger (2005)
 Sour Jazz - American Seizure (2009
 MJ12 (Gonzo Multimedia HST402CD) (2015)
 BC35 volume two (Bronson Recordings BRCD/004) (2019)

References

Living people
American rock drummers
1954 births
20th-century American drummers
American male drummers
20th-century American male musicians